Phyllobius pomaceus (subgenus Metaphyllobius) is a species of short-nosed weevil commonly known as the nettle weevil.

Description
Phyllobius pomaceus is a slender and elongate weevil, measuring 7–9 mm in length with bright metallic green scales, combined with variations of gold, blue and copper colour, on its elytra. Larvae measure up to 8 mm in length, with a creamy white coloured body and dark head.

Habitat and distribution
The beetle is associated with nettles (Urtica dioica) and  Meadow Sweet (Filipendula ulmaria). P. pomaceus can also be a pest of strawberries.

Larvae live within the soil feeding on roots, adults above ground on the leaves and stems of their host plants.

References

External links
 
 Biodiversity Heritage Library
 Fauna europaea

Entiminae
Beetles of Europe
Beetles described in 1834